Santrampur State (Sant State, also spelt Sunth and Soanth) is a former state located in the present-day state of Gujarat, India. On the east was the sub division of Jhalod in the Panch Mahals. On the south it touched the small state of Sanjeli while on the west it was bounded by the State of Lunavada.The State enjoyed a hereditary salute of 9 gun and 11 gun local salute. 
The rulers of Santrampur are Parmar Rajputs. They claim descent from the Mahipavat branch of the famous Malwa dynasty.

History 
According to bardic history, the state was founded in c. 1255 by an individual named Sant who had been forced to leave Jhalod upon the military defeat of his father, Jalamsingh. Sant's brother, Limdev, founded the nearby state of Kadana.

In 1753, The Maharawal of Banswara State, killed the three sons of Rana Ratansinhjii and tried to capture the throne of Sant State; the fourth son who was an infant named Badansinghji was hidden by Kolis of Malwa and grew up in a Koli family. The Maharawal annexed the Sant State in Banswara State and established his army in Sant. After several years, when Badansinghji reached maturity, the Kolis of Malwa attacked the army of Banswara. The Khant Kolis of Malwa defeated the army of Maharawal and threw it out of Sant state. After that, Kolis of Malwa established Rana Badansinghji Pawar at the throne of Sant State.

In 1803, Sant State entered into a defensive treaty with the British Government, but the latter subsequently reneged on the treaty under Lord Cornwallis' policy of not entering alliances with Indian states. Thereafter, on 10 August 1819, Sant State was party to an agreement between Scindia and Lunawada mediated by the British, which effectively made the state a British vassal. The state was placed under the administration of the Rewa Kantha Rewa Kantha Agency in 1825.

In 1913, the state was rocked by an adivasi (Bhil) uprising led by Govindgiri.

The last ruler of Sant State signed the accession to the Indian Union on 10 June 1948, by which the state ceased to exist and merged into Gujarat, and was assigned a Privy purse of 112,000 Rupees.

Rulers 

Rulers of Sant belongs to the Mahipavat branch of the Parmar clan of the Rajputs. The state is said to have been founded in the year 1255 by Sunth.

The Ruler of Sant is entitled to be received by the His Excellency the Viceroy and Governor-General of India and to be received and visited by the His Excellency the Governor of Bombay.

The ruler of Sant is titled as Maharana with the style of His Highness. His Highness the Maharana of Sant is entitled to a salute of 9 guns.

See also 
 Bombay Presidency
 List of Indian princely states (alphabetical)

References

External links and sources 

Princely states of Gujarat
Rajput princely states
Salute states
13th-century establishments in India
1255 establishments in Asia
1948 disestablishments in India
Bombay Presidency
States and territories established in 1255
Panchmahal district